Sacro Cuore ("Holy Heart") is a Catholic church located in Alcamo, in the province of Trapani.

History 
The parish of the Holy Heart of Jesus was established by the bishop of Trapani, monsignor Ricceri, on 4 October 1967. Several years before the Episcopal Curia (Catholic Church) of Trapani had bought a piece of land to build a Church which was to serve the new area that was expanding next to Viale Europa.

They started with a prefabricated structure, with a roof in asbestos cement, a hall, and two rooms; in 1978 they built the parsonage and other premises for the parish, but they had to wait until 1982 to start the real building which included the Church and the hall below it.

In 1987 Vincenzo Settipani, an architect, substituted Li Santi, who had died; he designed the mosaics, the stained glasses, the holy water stoups, the Baptismal font, the ambon and the altar. They were realized by the firm Pierotti from Pietrasanta (in the province of Lucca) and by the mosaicist Fabriano Fabret; the artistic and huge wooden confessional was made by the firm Gaspare Ferrantelli.
The Church was completed in 1991 and was consecrated in 1993.

Description and works 
The Church is with one nave and has the characteristic of a roof shaped like a boat overturned; inside it there are these works:
 Stained glass-windows on the two side walls representing the Sacraments on one side, and the three Theological Virtues (Faith, Hope and Charity) on the other side
 Mosaic of the Holy Heart of Jesus (with a background in pure gold), in the apse
 Tabernacle shaped like a sphere
 Mosaic of saint John the Evangelist, on the right
 Mosaic of the Virgin Mary, on the left
 Stations of the Cross (Via Crucis), in mosaic, represented with 10 stations as in Saint Luke's gospel
 Saint Pio, a mosaic by Gaetano Costa
 Saint Margaret Mary Alacoque, mosaic by Gaetano Costa
 The Holy Family, mosaic by Gaetano Costa, above the main door
 The Holy Communion: a monolithic marble altar with two bas-reliefs on two (Melchisedec and Abel's offerings to God)
 baptismal font: in monolithic marble, deep enough for the baptism by immersion; it has the shape of the corolla of a flower with 8 petals. It is closed by a transparent dome which is surmounted by a dove, symbol of the Holy Ghost and purification.
 Ambon: with the figure of an Angel announcing the Resurrection; in pink marble as the baptismal font
 Chapel of the Holy Sacrament: the tabernacle is placed in the middle of a white marble cross; on the left, there is a block of white marble that looks like a window.

In the sacristy there is a wooden statue of the Holy Heart of Jesus, made by Giuseppe Stuflesser from Ortisei in 1967.

See also 

 Catholic Church in Italy

References

Sources 
 Vincenzo Regina: La chiesa parrocchiale del Sacro Cuore di Gesù in Alcamo e il suo primo parroco; ed. Campo, 2005
 Carlo Cataldo: Guida Storico-Artistica dei Beni Culturali di Alcamo-Calatafimi-Castellammare del Golfo-Salemi-Vita; Sarograf, Alcamo, 1982
 Roberto Calia: Una città da scoprire: Alcamo; ed. Blu Imaging & ADV, Alcamo, 1991

External links 
 
 
 
 

Roman Catholic churches in Alcamo